Betws-y-coed (meaning: prayer house in the wood) is a village and community in the Conwy valley in Conwy County Borough, Wales, located in the historic county of Caernarfonshire, right on the boundary with Denbighshire, in the Gwydir Forest. It is now a very popular visitor destination in the Snowdonia National Park.

The village has a large village green which is bounded on its western side by the A5 trunk road. There are numerous 19th century buildings, including outdoor shops, hotels, and the Church of St Mary.

Toponymy 
The first part of the name of the village comes from the Anglo-Saxon Old English word bedhus, meaning "prayer house", or oratory which became betws in Welsh, and  translates to wood. The English name of the village is Prayer House in the Wood. The earliest record of the name is Betus, in 1254.

History 

The village, which is now within the Snowdonia National Park, stands in a valley near the point where the River Llugwy and the River Lledr join the River Conwy. The location is where a Celtic Christian community founded a monastery in the late 6th century AD.  A village developed around the site over subsequent centuries. In the medieval period, the local lead mining industry brought miners and their families to the village.

Following the Acts of Union 1800 between Ireland and the UK, better transport links were proposed between the two countries. Surveyors decided that the best route for a road (now the A5) between London and Holyhead should pass through the village. In 1815, Waterloo Bridge, built by Thomas Telford, opened to carry the Irish Mail road across the River Conwy and through the village. The establishment of the route brought an economic boost to the area as the village became a major mail coach stop between Corwen (to the east) and Capel Curig (to the west). It also led to improvement of the roads to Blaenau Ffestiniog and to Llanrwst and Conwy.

In 1868 Betws-y-Coed railway station opened with the completion of the Conwy Valley line. The railway was built to serve the mineral industries in Blaenau Ffestiniog. With the arrival of the railway from Llandudno Junction railway station, the village's population increased by around 500 people.

Places of worship

Church of St Mary is an active Anglican parish church of the Church in Wales, in the deanery of Arllechwedd, the archdeaconry of Bangor and the diocese of Bangor. It is designated by Cadw as a Grade II* listed building.

The Anglican church was constructed to accommodate increasing numbers of summer visitors to the area. It replaced the earlier 14th century AD St Michael's Old Church, from which the village took its name Betws. The building, which cost £5,000 (equivalent to £ in )., was designed by the Lancaster partnership of Paley and Austin. The principal benefactor was the Liverpool businessman Charles Kurtz. Work began on the village's former cockpit and fairground in 1870.

The church was consecrated in July 1873. Interior features include a wooden cross-beamed roof with walls and floors made from various types of stone, such as local bluestone, sandstone (floor tiles) from Ancaster, and black serpentine from Cornwall. There is seating for a congregation of 150 people.

The square bell tower was completed in 1907. An integrated church hall was added in the 1970s; its commemorative stone was laid by the Earl of Ancaster in 1976.

Governance
The parish, including the village itself and its immediate neighbourhood, has a population of 564. An electoral ward of the name Betws-y-Coed also exists. This ward includes a large additional area including two neighbouring communities Capel Curig and Dolwyddelan and has a total population of 1,244. The ward elects a county councillor to Conwy County Borough Council.

Transport

 
The Conwy Valley line passes through the village.  station buildings were constructed from local materials by local builder Owen Gethin Jones. The station had double platforms and an extensive goods yard. In the LMS timetables the station was listed as "Bettws-y-Coed - Station for Capel Curig". The Conwy Valley Railway Museum with its extensive miniature railway now occupies the former goods yard.

Since the opening of the A5 in the early 19th century, the village has been a primary destination for road signage in Snowdonia.

Tourism

Betws-y-Coed is one of the honeypot locations in Snowdonia. The village is also a centre for outdoor activities and lies within the Gwydyr Forest. 
The current Betws-y-Coed Golf Club was founded in the 1970s. There was a much earlier club and course located on or near the Recreation Ground. The Llyn Elsi reservoir nearby is popular with walkers and anglers, and also provides water for the village.  A wide range of footpaths provide access to the lake, both from Betws y Coed itself and the outlying village of Pentre Du. 
Other attractions in the village include the Miners' Bridge and the 14th century church of St. Michael, which is the origin of the name Betws (meaning "prayer-house"). There are scenic walks beside the River Llugwy, which flows through the village, and the River Conwy provides further attractions, including the Fairy Glen, the Conwy Fish pass and waterfalls including the Conwy Falls. The Pont-y-Pair Falls are in the centre of the village (also the site of a 53-hole rock cannon), and a mile upstream are the famous Swallow Falls. Next to the railway station there is the Conwy Valley Railway Museum.

Music
Melys, an independent rock band, were founded in Betws-y-Coed in 1997. The group, which sing in both English and Welsh, have recorded eleven sessions for John Peel on BBC Radio 1 and came first in his Festive Fifty in 2001 and won Best Welsh-language Act at the Welsh Music Awards in 2002.

References

Bibliography
 The A-Z of Betws-y-coed, by Donald Shaw.  Gwasg Carreg Gwalch, 1990.

External links